Perrottetia excelsa is a species of plant in the plant order Huerteales. It is endemic to Panama.

References

Flora of Panama
excelsa
Vulnerable plants
Taxonomy articles created by Polbot